Ilias Ennahachi (born May 15, 1996) is a Moroccan kickboxer currently signed to ONE Championship. He is the former ONE Kickboxing Flyweight World Champion, having won the title on August 16, 2019 until he vacated his title on January 3, 2023 due to hydration issues, the former Enfusion 60 kg champion, and the former BLADE 61 kg champion.

As of November 2021, Combat Press ranks him as the #4 bantamweight in the world. Combat Press ranked him as the #2 super bantamweight between September 2020 and July 2021. He was previously  ranked in the bantamweight top ten by Combat Press from May 2019 until August 2020.

Early life
Ennahachi was born and raised in the Netherlands by parents who were originally from Morocco. His dad and uncle practiced karate, and his cousins practiced kickboxing. At his father's urging, Ennahachi started training in kickboxing at age 11 and had his first match two months later.

Kickboxing career

Early career
Ilias was scheduled to fight Ali Zoubai for the Enfusion -60kg title in May 2016. Ennahachi won the bout by unanimous decision. Ennahachi defended his title five months later, during Enfusion Live 42, against Cristofer Opazos. He won by a first round TKO.

He challenged Hikaru Machida for the BLADE 61 kg title during Rebels 47. Ilias defeated Machida by unanimous decision.

Following his successful title bid, Ennahachi fought twice in China. He lost to Zhao Chongyang by KO, after only 32 seconds, and lost a decision to Wang Wenfeng.

He defended his Enfusion title for the second time with a TKO win over Krobsut Fairtex.

Ilias participated in the 2018 WFL 63 kg tournament. Ennahachi knocked Cătălin Eduard out with a head kick in the semifinals, and won a decision against Issam Laazibi in the finals.

Ennahachi defended his Enfusion title for the third time with a second round TKO win over Madani Belhaddad at Enfusion 82.

ONE Championship

ONE Flyweight Kickboxing champion
In June 2019, Ilias signed a two-year contract with ONE Championship. After signing with ONE, he was immediately granted a title shot against Petchdam Petchyindee Academy for the ONE Flyweight Kickboxing World Championship. On August 16, 2019, Ennahachi knocked Petchdam out in the third round at ONE Championship: Dreams of Gold.

On November 21, 2019, he defended his title against Wang Wenfeng at ONE Championship: Age Of Dragons. Ilias won a split decision.

Ennahachi defend his title against Superlek Kiatmuu9 at ONE Championship: Fists Of Fury on February 26, 2021. Ennahachi won by a controversial unanimous decision.

Ennahachi will defend his title against Superlek in an immediate rematch after the controversial nature of his win. The rematch between Ennahachi and Superlek was scheduled on January 14, 2023, at ONE on Prime Video 6. Ennahachi pulled out due to his inability to make the flyweight limit of 135 pounds while hydrated and decided to vacated the title. Superlek was re-scheduled to face Daniel Puertas for the vacant championship.

Move to bantamweight
Ennahachi faced Aliasghar Ghodratisaraskan at ONE Friday Fights 6 on February 24, 2023. He won the fight by a second-round knockout.

Titles
 ONE Championship
 ONE Flyweight Kickboxing World Champion   

 World Fighting League 
 2018 World Fighting League -63 kg Champion

 BLADE 
 2016 BLADE -61 kg Champion

 Enfusion 
 2016 Enfusion -60 kg Champion

Professional kickboxing record

|-  style="background:#cfc;"
| 2023-02-24|| Win ||align=left| Aliasghar Ghodratisaraskan || ONE Friday Fights 6, Lumpinee Stadium || Bangkok, Thailand || KO (Left hook) || 2  || 1:20

|-  style="background:#CCFFCC;"
| 2021-02-26|| Win ||align=left| Superlek Kiatmuu9 || ONE Championship: Fists Of Fury || Kallang, Singapore || Decision (Unanimous) || 5 || 3:00 
|-
! style=background:white colspan=9 |
|-  style="background:#CCFFCC;"
| 2019-11-21|| Win ||align=left| Wang Wenfeng || ONE Championship: Age Of Dragons || Beijing, China || Decision (Split) || 5 || 3:00
|-  style="background:#CCFFCC;"
|-  bgcolor="#cfc"
! style=background:white colspan=9 |
|-  style="background:#CCFFCC;"
| 2019-08-16|| Win|| align="left" | Petchdam Petchyindee Academy |||ONE Championship: Dreams of Gold || Bangkok, Thailand|| KO (Left Hook) || 3 || 1:00
|-  bgcolor="#cfc"
! style=background:white colspan=9 |
|-  style="background:#CCFFCC;"
| 2019-04-13 || Win || align="left" | Madani Belhaddad || Enfusion Live 82 || France || TKO || 2 || 
|-
! style=background:white colspan=9 |
|-  style="background:#CCFFCC;"
| 2018-11-24 || Win || align="left" | Enez Ilgin || Night of the Generation || Netherlands || KO (Low Kick) || 1 ||
|-  style="background:#CCFFCC;"
| 2018-10-21 || Win || align="left" | Issam Laazibi || World Fighting League, Final || Netherlands || Decision || 3 || 3:00
|-
! style=background:white colspan=9 |
|-  style="background:#CCFFCC;"
| 2018-10-21 || Win || align="left" | Eduard Cătălin|| World Fighting League, Semi Final || Netherlands || KO (High kick) || 1 ||
|-  style="background:#CCFFCC;"
| 2018-03-09 || Win || align="left" | Krobsut Fairtex || Enfusion Live 63 || Abu Dhabi || TKO (Punches) || 1 || 1:34
|-
! style=background:white colspan=9 |
|-  style="background:#FFBBBB;"
| 2017-11-05 || Loss ||align=left| Wang Wenfeng || Kunlun Fight 66 - 61.5 kg 8 Man Tournament, Quarter Finals || Wuhan, China || Decision || 3 || 3:00
|-  style="background:#FFBBBB;"
| 2017-04-08 || Loss ||align=left| Zhao Chongyang || Wu Lin Feng || Henan, China || KO (Right cross)|| 1 || 0:32
|-  style="background:#CCFFCC;"
| 2016-11-30 || Win || align="left" | Hikaru Machida || Rebels.47 || Tokyo, Japan || Decision (Unanimous) || 3 || 3:00
|-
! style=background:white colspan=9 |
|-  style="background:#CCFFCC;"
| 2016-10-08 || Win || align="left" | Cristofer Opazos || Enfusion Live 42 || Madrid, Spain || TKO (Punches) || 1 || 
|-
! style=background:white colspan=9 |
|-  style="background:#CCFFCC;"
| 2016-05-14 || Win || align="left" | Ali Zoubai || Fighting Rookies || Nijmegen, Netherlands || Decision || 3 || 3:00 
|-
! style=background:white colspan=9 |
|-  style="background:#CCFFCC;"
| 2016-01-23 || Win || align="left" | Ilias El Hajoui || Sportmani Events VIII || Amsterdam, Netherlands || TKO (High Kick) || 3 ||
|-  style="background:#CCFFCC;"
| 2015-02-07 || Win ||align=left| Tommy Dieckmann || Enfusion Talents || Eindhoven, Netherlands || Decision || 3 || 3:00
|-  style="background:#FFBBBB;"
| 2014-11-09 || Loss  ||align=left| Yosuke Morii || KICKBOXING ZONE || Japan || KO (Left Hook) || 1 || 2:40
|-  style="background:#CCFFCC;"
| 2014-09-28 || Win ||align=left| Wang Wenfeng || Wu Lin Feng - Mejiro Gym || Zaandam, Netherlands || Decision || 4 || 3:00
|-
| colspan=9 | Legend:

See also
List of male kickboxers
List of ONE Championship champions

References

1996 births
Living people
Bantamweight kickboxers 
Dutch male kickboxers 
Dutch sportspeople of Moroccan descent
Sportspeople from Utrecht (city)
Kunlun Fight kickboxers
ONE Championship kickboxers
Kickboxing champions
ONE Championship champions